"Kuha" is a Finnish Internet meme which became popular in 2015. The meme makes use of colloquial Finnish.

An example of the meme shows a picture of a zander with the head of a varanid, with the text Kuha on varaani mikäs siinä, meaning "The zander is a varanid, so what", the text being a colloquial form of Kunhan on varaa, niin mikäs siinä, meaning "As long as you can afford it, so what". There are also Facebook and Instagram pages for "kuha" memes.

References

Internet memes
Finnish language